Sfakiotes is a former municipality on the island of Lefkada, Ionian Islands, Greece. Since the 2011 local government reform it is part of the municipality Lefkada, of which it is a municipal unit. It is landlocked and located in the northern part of the island, just south of Lefkada. It has a land area of 30.494 km² and a population 1,377 (2011 census). The seat of the municipality was in the town of Lazarata (pop. 526). Other larger villages are Pinakochóri (214), Kávallos (180), Exántheia (pop. 170), and Spanochóri (161). The municipal name owes its origin to its first inhabitants who came from Sfakia and Chora Sfakion in the island of Crete. The municipal unit also features the Melissa gorge, one of the most beautiful points of interest on the island.

Subdivisions 
The municipal unit Sfakiotes is subdivided into the following communities:
Asprogerakata
Drymonas
Exanthia
Kavallos
Lazarata
Pinakochori
Spanochori

Twinnings 
The town is twinned with:

 Leverano, Italy,

Population

References

External links 
Official website 
Sfakiotes on GTP Travel Pages (in English and Greek)

See also 
List of settlements in the Lefkada regional unit

Populated places in Lefkada (regional unit)